Jacksen is a given name. Notable people with the name include:

Jacksen Pierce (1894–1939) American author
Jacksen F. Tiago (born 1968), Brazilian footballer and manager

See also
Jackson (name)

Masculine given names